Cheniseo is a genus of North American dwarf spiders that was first described by S. C. Bishop & C. R. Crosby in 1935.

Species
 it contains four species:
Cheniseo fabulosa Bishop & Crosby, 1935 (type) – USA
Cheniseo faceta Bishop & Crosby, 1935 – USA
Cheniseo recurvata (Banks, 1900) – USA (Alaska)
Cheniseo sphagnicultor Bishop & Crosby, 1935 – USA, Canada

See also
 List of Linyphiidae species

References

Araneomorphae genera
Linyphiidae
Spiders of North America